The Snob is a 1924 American silent drama film directed by Monta Bell. The film starred Norma Shearer and John Gilbert (prior to their stardom), together with Phyllis Haver, Conrad Nagel, and Hedda Hopper. The film was written by Monta Bell, and was based on the novel The Snob: The Story of a Marriage by Helen Reimensnyder Martin.

Plot
As described in a review in a film magazine, just as Nancy Claxton (Shearer) finished at a convent school, her wealthy father Sherwood (Sackville) is killed in a roadhouse brawl. Stung by the disgrace, she disappears and her sweetheart, Herrick (Nagel), is unable to find her. Three years pass and Nancy is teaching school in the quaint Mennonite colony in Pennsylvania. She falls in love with an ambitious teacher, Eugene (Gilbert). They become engaged and Eugene gets a job as professor at an academy in a nearby town. He becomes popular and conceited, succeeds in winning favor of Dorothy (Haver), whose father owns the school. Eugene is made head-master. Nancy becomes ill and sends for Eugene. He marries her, believing she will die, but she gets well. He writes Dorothy a letter belittling Nancy. Herrick, who is teaching in the same school, visits Eugene and is amazed to find Nancy. Eugene continues to look down on Nancy and play up to Dorothy. Just before Nancy is to have a baby, he writes a loving letter to Dorothy. Nancy gets hold of this. Her baby dies. She then sees Eugene in his true light and shows him the newspaper story that she is heir to millions. He begs forgiveness but she taunts him as being a snob, saying she will divorce him and marry Herrick.

Cast

Preservation
With no prints of The Snob located in any film archives, it is a lost film.

References

External links

Norma Shearer and John Gilbert in a sequence from the film
Stills at normashearer.com

1924 films
1924 drama films
Silent American drama films
American silent feature films
American black-and-white films
Films based on American novels
Lost American films
Metro-Goldwyn-Mayer films
1924 lost films
Lost drama films
1920s American films